The 1991 African Youth Championship was a football tournament for under-20 players. It was held in Egypt from 22 February until 8 March 1991. The two best teams qualified for the 1991 FIFA World Youth Championship.

Qualifying

First round
The first leg matches were played on 10–12 August 1990.  The second leg matches were held on 24–26 August 1990.

Burkina Faso, Liberia, Congo and Mauritius withdrew: Togo, Ghana, Cameroon and Zimbabwe advanced to the second round, while Algeria, Ghana and Mali received byes.

Central African Republic withdrew after the first leg, with Gabon being awarded a 2-0 victory for the second leg and advancing to the second round.

Guinea were ejected from the competition for using ineligible players.

|}

Second round
The first leg matches were played on either 27–29 October 1990, and the second leg matches were held on 11 November 1990. The winners advanced to the final tournament in Egypt. 

Togo withdrew, meaning Algeria qualified for the final tournament, while Gabon were ejected from the competition for using ineligible players.

|}

Teams
Algeria and Tunisia would not participate in the main tournament due to the Gulf War. The following teams qualified for the main tournament:

 
 
  (host)

Group stage

Group A
{| cellpadding="0" cellspacing="0" width="100%"
|-
|width="60%"|

 final positions were decided by drawing of lots

Group B
{| cellpadding="0" cellspacing="0" width="100%"
|-
|width="60%"|

Knock-out stage

Semifinals

Third place

Final

Qualification to World Youth Championship
The two best performing teams qualified for the 1991 FIFA World Youth Championship.

External links
Results by RSSSF

Africa U-20 Cup of Nations
Youth
1991
1991 in youth association football